Charles W. Ballard (July 6, 1836 – October 15, 1891) was a member of the Connecticut Senate representing the 12th District from 1865 to 1867.

He was the son of Joseph Ballard and Emeline Jones.

In the election of 1865, he defeated Asa Smith 2223 to 1441.

In the election of 1866, he defeated Asa Smith 2448 to 2327.

In his capacity as a senator, he also served as ex officio member of the Corporation of Yale College.

References

1836 births
1891 deaths
19th-century American dentists
Connecticut state senators
People from Darien, Connecticut
19th-century American politicians
20th-century American dentists